All The King's Horses is an album by The Legendary Pink Dots. It was released in 2002. It derives its title from a line in the Humpty Dumpty nursery rhyme.

Track listing
The Unlikely Event
The Way I Feel Today
12th
Our Dominion
Chain Surfing
Just Wave
It's the Real Thing
A Bargain at Twice the Price
Daisy
Birdie
Lisa Goes Surfing
Wax and Feathers

Credits
Edward Ka-Spel - voice, keyboards
The Silverman (Phil Knight) - keyboards, electronics
Martijn de Kleer - guitars, violin
Niels van Hoorn - horns
Raymond Steeg - sound wizardry

References

The Legendary Pink Dots albums
2002 albums